Eric Max Frye (born 1956) is an American screenwriter and film director from Oregon. In 2015, he received an Academy Award nomination for co-writing, with  Dan Futterman, the original screenplay for Foxcatcher.

Early life and education
Frye was born in Oregon and raised in Eugene. His parents were Helen (Jackson) Frye, a federal judge, and William Frye. He attended Lewis & Clark College in Portland for one year before moving to Europe. He lived in Paris and worked as a male model in Austria. After returning to the United States, Frye settled in New York City where he attended New York University Film School.

Career
Part way through the colour music video clip of the 1986 song "Bizarre Love Triangle" by the English rock band New Order, Frye makes a cameo appearance arguing with Jodi Long about reincarnation. As the main part of the song and video in colour momentarily stops and cuts into a black and white (monochrome) scene, the music also pauses as Long gasps and strenuously proclaims "I don't believe in reincarnation, because I refuse to come back as a bug or as a rabbit!" to which Frye casually replies, "You know, you're a real UP person". The video immediately reverts to full colour mode and the music and original video content continues on.

Frye wrote the screenplay for Something Wild (1986), and many other Hollywood and independent movies. Frye directed and wrote the comedy film Amos & Andrew (1993).

He was a co-screenwriter for Foxcatcher (2014), a film about John Eleuthere du Pont and his 1996 murder of World and Olympic champion wrestler, Dave Schultz.

He was one of the writers for the HBO miniseries Band of Brothers (2001).

Filmography
As screenwriter
 Something Wild (1986)
 Amos & Andrew (1993) - Also Director
 Palmetto (1998)
 Where the Money Is (2000)
 Foxcatcher (2014)

Honors and awards

References

External links
 

Writers from Eugene, Oregon
American male screenwriters
American television writers
1956 births
Living people
Lewis & Clark College alumni
South Eugene High School alumni
Edgar Award winners
Tisch School of the Arts alumni
Film directors from Oregon
American male television writers
Screenwriters from Oregon
20th-century American screenwriters
20th-century American male writers
21st-century American screenwriters
21st-century American male writers